Ion Velea (born 14 September 1947) is a Romanian former footballer and referee. He was part of "U" Craiova's team that won the 1973–74 Divizia A, which was the first trophy in the club's history. After he ended his playing career he became a referee who arbitrated Divizia A matches over the course of 12 years, he also arbitrated at European club level.

Honours
Universitatea Craiova
Divizia A: 1973–74

Notes

References

External links
Ion Velea player profile at Labtof.ro
Ion Velea referee profile at Labtof.ro

1947 births
Living people
Romanian footballers
Association football defenders
Liga I players
Liga II players
CS Universitatea Craiova players
FCV Farul Constanța players
CS Pandurii Târgu Jiu players
Romanian football referees
Footballers from Bucharest